Meridemis detractana is a species of moth of the family Tortricidae first described by Francis Walker in 1863. It is found in Sri Lanka.

Its larval host plants are Lantana species.

References

Moths described in 1863
Archipini